The Rev. Alfred Joseph Kunz (April 15, 1930 – March 4, 1998) was a Catholic priest who was found with his throat slit in his Roman Catholic church in Dane, Wisconsin. By 2009, 11 years later, Kunz's unsolved murder was likely the most expensive and time-consuming homicide investigation in Dane County's history.

Kunz was known for celebrating the Traditional Latin Mass as well as the Mass in English and was in communion with his diocesan bishop. "Father Kunz was a well-known expert in canon law, so he knew how to walk the lines," Bill Brophy, a spokesman for the Madison, Wisconsin Catholic Diocese said shortly after his murder. Kunz was pastor at the church for 32 years before his death.

In 2019, the Kunz case was featured on the "Unsolved III: The Devil You Know" podcast, a project of the Milwaukee Journal Sentinel. In 2022, the case was featured in an episode of the HLN (owned by CNN) original series "Real Life Nightmare with Paul Holes." 

Twenty-five years later, in 2023, the case remains unsolved. There are various theories and rumors about why Kunz was murdered, but no arrests have been made. Former Dane County Sheriff Dave Mahoney said in a March 2023 interview: "At some point in time, [the killer needs] to resolve it in their own soul and own mind and come forward. It resonates and haunts, if you will, myself and many, many others who want this resolved, and I look forward to the day that it can be resolved, and I'll sleep better." The Sheriff's Office is still seeking tips that may help solve the case.

See also 
 List of homicides in Wisconsin

Notes

1931 births
1998 deaths
American murder victims
Catholic exorcists
Catholics from Wisconsin
Deaths by person in Wisconsin
Male murder victims
March 1998 events in the United States
March 1998 crimes
1998 in Wisconsin
1998 murders in the United States
People murdered in Wisconsin
20th-century American Roman Catholic priests
Deaths by blade weapons
Unsolved murders in the United States